The list of fountains in the Kansas City metropolitan area contains those now officially recognized by the City of Fountains Foundation. The trend began in the late 1800s with humanitarian public drinking water projects in Kansas City, Missouri, and this identity has influenced fountains across the Kansas City metropolitan area. In 1992, the city of Kansas City, Missouri added "City of Fountains" to its official corporate seal.

Overview
Water fountains are part of Kansas City's core identity and culture, including a graphic design of a stylized fountain in the city's official logo. Interest in fountains arose during the City Beautiful movement in the 1890s. In 1898, George Kessler, a landscape architect and urban planner, designed the first fountain built by the city of Kansas City, Missouri at 15th and The Paseo. Another fountain that he designed the same year is now known as The Women's Leadership Fountain, and is located at 9th Street and The Paseo as the oldest in the city. The design originally included an oval, cut limestone basin with water spraying upward from nozzles in the center of its pool surrounded by a raised sidewalk, a flower garden, gas lamps, and a balustrade above to the south. The fountain was destroyed in 1941 and rebuilt in 1970 and 1990, and began its third major restoration in January 2008 planned for completion in 2009. Kessler went on to include numerous plans for fountains in his urban designs of the park and boulevard system.

Typically, most of the first fountains in Kansas City served practical rather than decorative purposes. In 1904, the Humane Society of Kansas City in Kansas – established to prevent cruelty to women, children and animals – built a characteristic fountain near the west end of Minnesota Avenue at North 3rd Street. Water poured out of spigots in lions' mouths so that people could get clean water in their cups. This water fell into a granite basin at a height for horses to drink. The overflow from the basin went into four small pools at street level for dogs to drink. A street light was on top; in 1967, the fountain was given to the Wyandotte County Museum. The Humane Society went on to mount more than 100 fountains, including ones made of bronze created for people alone for sanitary purposes.

Fountain building and the use of decorative statuary exploded in the 1920s after developer J.C. Nichols used them extensively in the development of Country Club Plaza. The most famous fountain in Kansas City is appropriately named J.C. Nichols Memorial Fountain. The figures were originally created by French sculptor Henri-Léon Gréber in 1910 for "Harbor Hill", the estate of Clarence Mackay in Roslyn, New York. The four allegorical equestrian figures reportedly represent four great rivers of the world — the Mississippi River, Volga River, Seine River, and Rhine River. The work is enlivened by sculptures of little children riding dolphins in the pool surrounding the main figures.

The William Volker Memorial Fountain includes the last sculptures by Swedish artist Carl Milles. The five-piece ensemble of bronze statuary shows Saint Martin of Tours, patron saint of France, on horseback, giving his clothes to a beggar surrounded by two angels (one absurdly wearing a wristwatch) and a curious little demon in hiding. The sculptures rest between two pools of water with jet sprays along Volker Boulevard, and sits above a dramatic three-tier,  waterfall into a basin on Brush Creek.

The Eagle Scout Memorial Fountain was originally part of the Seventh Avenue clock created by A.A. Weinman for the Pennsylvania Station in New York City.  When the station was torn down, Kansas City petitioned to obtain the clock sculpture and replaced its face with an Eagle Scout tribute.

The Waterworks Spectacular has been dousing the outfield during baseball games at Kauffman Stadium for more than 30 years.

0–9
49/63 Neighborhood Fountain
5901 College Boulevard
7007 College Boulevard
7101 Tower

A–B
A Mind Soothed at The Nelson-Atkins Museum of Art
Adam and Eve at Jacob L. Loose Park
Adams Dairy Parkway Fountain
Aleman Court Fountain
Alfred Benjamin Memorial Fountain
Allen Memorial Fountain
American Legion Fountain at Budd Park
American Legion Fountain at Swope Park
American War Mothers Memorial Fountain
Ameristar
Antioch Park
Armour Center Fountain
Armour Green Fountain
Bannister Mall Fountain (closed)
Barnes Memorial Fountain
Barney Allis Plaza Fountain
Belinder Court Fountain
Bernard Powell Memorial Fountain
Boy and Frog Fountain
Boy with Frog
Brookwood Fountain
Bronze Boar Fountain
Brush Creek Fountains

C–E
Carl J. DiCapo Fountain
CarMax
Children at Play Wall Fountain
Children's Fountain
City of Westwood Hills
Clock Tower Plaza Fountain
Colonial Court 
Commerce Bank
Commerce Bank - Country Club Plaza
Commerce Tower Sunken Garden Fountain
Court of Lions Fountains
Court of Lions Fountain II
Court of Lions Fountain III
Court of the Penguins Fountain
Crown Center
Crown Center Entrance Fountains
D. W. Newcomers Sons Funeral Home Fountains
Delbert J. Haff Fountains, sculpture by Jorgen Dreyer
Diana
Diane: Sitting
Double Monopole
E. F. Pierson Sculpture Garden Fountain
Eagle Scout Memorial Fountain
Eighth Street Fountain I
Eighth Street Fountain II
Embassy Suites Atrium Fountain
Epperson House Wall Fountain
Eubank Memorial Fountain
Ewing & Muriel Kauffman Memorial Fountain

F–K
Federal Building
Firefighters Fountain
Fountain of Bacchus
Four Fauns Fountain
Frank S. Land Memorial Fountain
Grandview City Hall Veterans Memorial
H & R Bloch Courtyard Fountain
Hallmark Corporate Entrance
Harold D. Rice Fountain
Harry Evans Minty Memorial Fountain
Harvester KC
Helen Cuddy Memorial Rose Garden Fountain
Helen Spradling Boylan Memorial
Henry Wollman Bloch Memorial Fountain
Hillside Fountain
Hyatt Regency Crown Center
Ilus Davis Civic Mall Fountain
J C Nichols Memorial
Jay Wolfe Memorial
Jefferson Pointe Apartments
Joe Dennis Park
John Knox Fountain
Kansas City Board of Trade Fountain
Kansas City Life 100-year Commemorative Plaza
Kansas City Star Fountain
Kansas City University Fountains
Kingswood Manor Fountain

L–O
Leawood City Hall Courtyard Fountain
Lenexa City Hall Fountain
Liberty Courtyard Fountain
Liberty Memorial Fountain
Lighton Plaza I
Lighton Plaza II
Loose Park Lake
Loose Park Rose Garden Fountain
Marlborough Plaza
Marriott Kansas City Downtown
Marriott Residence Inn
Martha & Jack Steadman Fountain
Mary A. Fraser Memorial Fountain
Mermaid Fountain
Meyer Circle Sea Horse Fountain
Mill Creek Sanctuary
Mission Hills City Hall
Molamphy Memorial
Muse of the Missouri
Nebraska Furniture Mart II
Nebraska Furniture Mart III
Neptune Fountain
Newport Apartment Fountain
Northeast Concourse
Northland Fountain
One Sun/34 Moons

P–S
Parkville Spirit Fountain
Parkway Towers fountain
Penn Tower Building Atrium Fountain
Pomona Fountain
Prairie Village Gateway
Pratt Memorial Fountain, Dagg Park
Prospect Plaza Fountain
Providence Medical Center Fountain
Quenching Cup
R.R. Osborne Plaza
Renner Boulevard Fountains (4)
Robert H. Gillham Fountain
Rockhurst
Romanelli Gardens Fountain
Romany Fountain
Russell Stover Fountain
Scottish Rite Temple
Sea Horse Fountain at City Hall
Seville Light Fountain
Shawnee Mission Pkwy
Shirley Bush Helzberg Garden of the Stars
Silverbrooke Community Waterfall
Sixty-Ninth St. Fountain
South Garden Reflecting Pool and Patio
Spirit of Freedom Fountain
Station Park Plaza
Stowers Gift of Life Fountain
Stratford Garden Park Fountain
Swan Fountain

T–Z
The Fountains Luxury Retail Center
The Meadows
Thomas H. Swope Memorial Fountain
Thousand Oaks fountain/sculpture
Three Lakes Apartments
Tomahawk Fountain
Veterans of Foreign Wars Centennial Plaza
Vietnam Veterans Fountain
Ward Parkway Mirror Pool Fountain
Water Spectacular
Waterfall, Park University
Westin Crown Center Hotel Lobby Fountain
Westside Fountain
Westwood, Kansas
William T. Fitzsimons Memorial
William Volker Memorial
Willow Lake
Wm.T. & Charlotte Kemper Memorial
Women's Leadership
Wornall Road & 67th Street Fountain

References

External links

List of Kansas City Fountains at KCMO.org
Hunting Fountains in Kansas City
Fountains of Kansas City

Kansas City Metropolitan Area
Culture of Kansas City, Missouri
Kansas culture
Lists of buildings and structures in Kansas
Lists of buildings and structures in Missouri
Kansas City
Kansas City
Missouri culture
Outdoor sculptures in Kansas
Outdoor sculptures in Missouri
Tourist attractions in Kansas City, Missouri